The following outline is provided as an overview of and topical guide to ancient Greece:

Ancient Greece –

Geography of Ancient Greece 
 Towns of ancient Greece
List of ancient Greek cities

Regions of Ancient Greece
Regions of ancient Greece

 Peloponnese
 Achaea
 Patras
 Dyme
 Arcadia
 Argolis
 Argos
 Mycenae
 Tiryns
 Epidaurus
 Corinthia
 Corinth
 Sicyon
 Elis
 Elis (city)
 Olympia
 Laconia
 Sparta
 Messenia
 Messene
 Central Greece
 Aeniania
 Attica
 Athens
 Boeotia
 Thebes
 Orchomenus
 Chaeronea
 Doris
 Euboea
 Chalcis
 Eretria
 Locris
 Megaris
 Megara
 Oetaea
 Phocis
 Delphi
 Elatea
 Acarnania
 Stratos
 Aetolia
 Thermos
 Aperantia
 Dolopia
 Thessaly
 Pherae
 Larissa
 Autonomous Subregion
 Magnesia
 Subregions within Thessaly
 Achaea Phthiotis
 Histiaeotis
 Pelasgiotis
 Perrhaebia
 Epirus
Cities in ancient Epirus
 Chaonia
 Cestrine
 Chimaera
 Buthrotum
 Panormos
 Onchesmos
 Antigonia
 Pelion
 Dassaretia
 Antipatrea
 Kodrion
 Gertus
 Creonion
 Molossis
 Thesprotia
 Parauaea
 Tymphaea
 Macedon
 Pelagonia
 Aegean Sea
 Crete
 Cyprus
 Ionian Sea
 Hellespont
 Sea of Marmara
 Bosphorus
 Asia Minor
 Ionia
 Smyrna
 Aeolis
 Cyme
 Doris
 Halicarnassus
 Pontus
 Magna Grecia
 Greek colonies

Government and politics of ancient Greece 

 Greek democracy
 Athenian democracy

Ancient Greek law 

Ancient Greek law
 Ancient Greek lawmakers
 Draco – first legislator of Athens in Ancient Greece. He replaced the prevailing system of oral law and blood feud by a written code to be enforced only by a court. Draco's written law became known for its harshness, with the adjective "draconian" referring to similarly unforgiving rules or laws.
Draconian constitution – first written constitution of Athens. So that no one would be unaware of them, they were posted on wooden tablets (ἄξονες – axones), where they were preserved for almost two centuries, on steles of the shape of three-sided pyramids (κύρβεις – kyrbeis).
 Solon – Athenian statesman and lawmaker, remembered for the Solonian Constitution.
Solonian Constitution – a code of laws embracing the whole of public and private life. It sought to revise or abolish the older laws of Draco.
Seisachtheia – a set of laws instituted by the Athenian lawmaker Solon in order to rectify the widespread serfdom and slavery that had run rampant in Athens by the 6th century BC, by debt relief.
 Dreros inscription – the earliest surviving inscribed law from ancient Greece.
 Heliaia, the supreme court of ancient Athens.

Military history of ancient Greece 

Military history of ancient Greece

Military of ancient Greece 

 Ancient Greek warfare
 Ancient Greek mercenaries
 Ancient Greek military personal equipment
 Athenian military
 Hoplite
 Hoplite phalanx
 Military tactics in Ancient Greece
 Homosexuality in the militaries of ancient Greece
 Military of Mycenaean Greece

Military powers and alliances 

 Ionian League (started mid-7th century BC)
 1st Achaean League (formed in 5th century BC)
 Delian League (478–404 BCE)
 Spartan hegemony (431–371 BCE)
 Theban hegemony (371–362 BCE)
 League of Corinth (338–322 BCE)
 Peloponnesian League (6th to 4th century BC)
 Arcadian League (370 to 3rd century BCE)
 2nd Achaean League (280–146 BCE)
 Aetolian League (4th to 3rd century BCE?)

Military conflicts 

Trojan War
 Returns from Troy
 Trojan War characters
Lelantine War
Messenian Wars
First Messenian War
Second Messenian War
Third Messenian War
First Sacred War
 Greco-Persian Wars – series of conflicts between the Achaemenid Empire of Persia and city-states of the Hellenic world that started in 499 BC and lasted until 449 BC.
Battle of Ephesus (498 BC)
Battle of Lade
Battle of Marathon
Battle of Thermopylae
Battle of Salamis
Battle of Plataea
Battle of Mycale
Battle of the Eurymedon
First Peloponnesian War
Battle of Oenophyta
Battle of Coronea (447 BC)
Battle of Tanagra (457 BC)
Sicilian Wars
Battle of Himera (480 BC)
Battle of Himera (409 BC)
Peloponnesian War
Battle of Arginusae
Battle of Delium
Battle of Rhium
Battle of Sybota
Battle of Potidaea
Battle of Naupactus
Battle of Notium
Battle of Syme
Battle of Cynossema
Battle of Pylos
Battle of Sphacteria
Battle of Amphipolis
Battle of Mantinea (418 BC)
Battle of Olpae
Sicilian Expedition
Battle of Syme
Battle of Cyzicus
Battle of Aegospotami
Corinthian War
Battle of Coronea (394 BC)
Battle of Naxos
Battle of Leuctra
Battle of Cynoscephalae
Battle of Mantinea (362 BC)
March of the 10,000
Battle of Cunaxa
Battle of Crocus Field
Boeotian War
Foreign War

Wars of Alexander the Great
Battle of Chaeronea
Battle of the Granicus
Battle of Issus
Siege of Tyre (332 BC)
Battle of Gaugamela
Battle of the Hydaspes River
Lamian War
Battle of Crannon
Wars of the Diadochi
Battle of Corupedium
Battle of Crannon
Battle of Gabiene
Battle of Gaza (312 BC)
Battle of Ipsus
Battle of Paraitacene
Battle of Raphia
Battle of Salamis (306 BC)
Chremonidean War
Battle of Sellasia
Battle of Cynoscephalae
Battle of Asculum
Cretan War
Macedonian Wars
First Macedonian War
Second Macedonian War
Third Macedonian War
Battle of Pydna
Fourth Macedonian War
Battle of Pydna (148 BC)
Achaean War
Battle of Corinth (146 BC)

General history of ancient Greece 

 Timeline of ancient Greece

Ancient Greek history, by period 

 Prehistoric Greek history
Neolithic Greece
Aegean Bronze Age 
Helladic chronology
Eutresis culture
Korakou culture
Mycenaean Greece
 Late Bronze Age collapse
 Dorian invasion
 Greek Dark Ages
 Iron Age Greek migrations
 History of ancient Greece (timeline)
 Archaic Greece
 Greek colonisation
 Rise of the polis
 Greco-Persian Wars
 Siege of Naxos (499 BC)
 Ionian Revolt
Battle of Ephesus (498 BC)
First Persian invasion of Greece
Second Persian invasion of Greece
Pentecontaetia
 Classical Greece
 Hellenistic Greece
 Roman Greece

Ancient Greek history, by region 

 
 Ancient Athens
 Athenian democracy – democracy in the Greek city-state of Athens developed around the fifth century BC, making Athens one of the first known democracies in the world, comprising the city of Athens and the surrounding territory of Attica. It was a system of direct democracy, in which eligible citizens voted directly on legislation and executive bills.
 Solon (c. 638 – c. 558 BC)– Athenian statesman, lawmaker, and poet. Legislated against political, economic, and moral decline in archaic Athens. His reforms failed in the short term, yet he is often credited with having laid the foundations for Athenian democracy.
 Cleisthenes (born around 570 BC). – father of Athenian democracy. He reformed the constitution of ancient Athens and set it on a democratic footing in 508/7 BC.
 Ephialtes (died 461 BC) – led the democratic revolution against the Athenian aristocracy, which exerted control through the Areopagus, the most powerful body in the state. Ephialtes proposed a reduction of the Areopagus' powers, and the Ecclesia (the Athenian Assembly) adopted Ephialtes' proposal without opposition. This reform signaled the beginning of a new era of "radical democracy" for which Athens would become famous. 
 Pericles – arguably the most prominent and influential Greek statesman. When Ephialtes was assassinated for overthrowing the elitist Council of the Aeropagus, his deputy Pericles stepped in. He was elected strategos (one of ten such posts) in 445 BCE, which he held continuously until his death in 429 BCE, always by election of the Athenian Assembly. The period during which he led Athens, roughly from 461 to 429 BC, is known as the "Age of Pericles".
 Ostracism – procedure under the Athenian democracy in which any citizen could be expelled from the city-state of Athens for ten years.
 Areopagus – council of elders of Athens, similar to the Roman Senate. Like the Senate, its membership was restricted to those who had held high public office, in this case that of Archon. In 594 BC, the Areopagus agreed to hand over its functions to Solon for reform.
 Ecclesia – principal assembly of the democracy of ancient Athens during its "Golden Age" (480–404 BCE). It was the popular assembly, open to all male citizens with 2 years of military service. In 594 BC, Solon allowed all Athenian citizens to participate, regardless of class, even the thetes (manual laborers).
 History of Sparta
 History of Macedonia (ancient kingdom)
 History of Crete#Iron Age and Archaic Crete
 Asia Minor#Greek West
 History of Greek and Hellenistic Sicily
 Greeks in pre-Roman Gaul
 History of Marseille#Antiquity
 Cyrenaica#Greek rule
 Bosporan Kingdom
 Ptolemaic Kingdom
 Cyrenaica#Resumption of Greek rule
 Coele-Syria
 Seleucid Empire
 Tylos
 Greco-Bactrian Kingdom
 Indo-Greek Kingdom

Ancient Greek History, by subject 
 History of the Greek alphabet
 Names of the Greeks

Ancient Greek historiography

Works on ancient Greek history 

 History of the Peloponnesian War

Culture of ancient Greece 

Culture of ancient Greece
 Ancient Greek calendars
Attic calendar
 Clothing in ancient Greece
 Chiton
 Chlamys
 Exomis
 Himation
 Kolpos
 Peplos
 Tainia
 Zone
 Zoster
 Clubs in ancient Greece
 Coinage of ancient Greece
 Cuisine of ancient Greece
 Kykeon
 Wine in ancient Greece
Symposium
Kottabos
Syssitia
 Education in ancient Greece
 Paideia
 Fiction set in ancient Greece
 Greek gardens
 Marriage in ancient Greece
 People in ancient Greece
 Ancient Greeks
 Seven Sages of Greece
 Cleobulus of Lindos 
 Solon of Athens
 Chilon of Sparta
 Bias of Priene
 Thales of Miletus
 Pittacus of Mytilene (c. 640 – 568 BC)
 Periander of Corinth (fl. 627 BC)
 Ancient Greek tribes
 Ancient Greek personal names
 Sexuality in ancient Greece
Adultery in Classical Athens
 Homosexuality in ancient Greece
Homosexuality in the militaries of ancient Greece
 Pederasty in ancient Greece
Athenian pederasty
 Prostitution in ancient Greece
 Slavery in ancient Greece
 Women in Classical Athens

Architecture of ancient Greece 

Architecture of ancient Greece
 Acropolis
 Acropolis of Athens
 Agora
 Ancient Agora of Athens
 Ancient Greek baths
Greek baths of Gela
Greek Baths in ancient Olympia
 Delphinion
 Metroon
 Odeon
Odeon of Athens
Odeon of Herodes Atticus
 Propylaea
 Ancient Greek roofs
 Stoa
Ancient Greek stoae
Stoa of Attalos
 Ancient Greek temple
 Ancient Greek temples
 Parthenon
 Temple of Artemis
 Temple of Zeus
 Temple of Hephaestus
 Samothrace temple complex
 Ancient Greek walls

Art in ancient Greece 

Art in ancient Greece
 Death in ancient Greek art
 Music of ancient Greece
Musical system of ancient Greece
Ancient Greek Musical Notation
Seikilos epitaph
 Painting in ancient Greece
 Pottery of ancient Greece
Ancient Greek vase painting
Bilingual vase painting
Black-figure pottery
Red-figure pottery
White ground technique
Greek terracotta figurines
Tanagra figurine
Hellenistic glass
 Sculpture in ancient Greece
Severe style
Hellenistic art
 Sport in ancient Greek art
 Theatre of ancient Greece
 Chorus of the elderly in classical Greek drama
 Greek comedy
Old Comedy
 Greek tragedy
 Greek chorus
 Satyr play
 List of ancient Greek playwrights
 List of ancient Greek theatres
 Phlyax play
 Representation of women in Athenian tragedy
 Use of costume in Athenian tragedy
 Warfare in ancient Greek art

Literature in ancient Greece 

Literature in ancient Greece
 Greek lyric
 Greek novel
 Writers
 Aeschylus
 Aesop
 Aristophanes
 Euripides
 Herodotus
 Hesiod
 Homer
 Lucian
 Menander
 Pindar
 Plutarch
 Polybius
 Sappho
 Sophocles
 Theognis of Megara
 Thucydides
 Xenophon

Philosophy in ancient Greece 

Philosophy in ancient Greece

Ancient Greek schools of philosophy
Pre-Socratic
Atomism
Eleatics
Ephesian school
Ionian School
Milesian school
Pluralist school
Pythagoreanism

Classical Greek
Aristotelianism
Cynicism
Cyrenaics
Eretrian school
Megarian school
Peripatetic school
Platonism
Hellenistic
Academic skepticism
Epicureanism
Middle Platonism
Neoplatonism
Neopythagoreanism
Pyrrhonism
Stoicism

Philosophers of ancient Greece
 Anaxagoras
 Anaximander
 Anaximenes
 Antisthenes
 Aristotle
 Democritus
 Diogenes
 Empedocles
 Epicurus
 Heraclitus
 Leucippus
 Gorgias
 Parmenides
 Plato
 Protagoras
 Pythagoras
 Socrates
 Thales
 Zeno

Language in ancient Greece 

Ancient Greek
 Ancient Greek, by period
 Mycenaean Greek language
 Homeric Greek
 Old Greek
Koine Greek
Late Greek
 Ancient Greek dialects
 Aeolic Greek
 Arcadocypriot Greek
 Attic Greek
 Doric Greek
 Ionic Greek
 Locrian Greek
 Ancient Macedonian language
 Ancient Greek grammar
 Ancient Greek phonology
 Greek alphabet
Archaic Greek alphabets
Greek letters used in mathematics, science, and engineering
 Greek diacritics
 Greek inscriptions
 Greek Numbers
 Greek numerals
 Greek orthography
 Greek phrases
 Greek verbs
 Greek words for love
Eros

Religion in ancient Greece 

Religion in ancient Greece
 Twelve Olympians
 Greek mythology
 Modern understanding of Greek mythology
 Greek mythological figures
 Family tree of the Greek gods
Greek primordial deities
 Greek mythological creatures
Dragons in Greek mythology
 Greek mythology in popular culture
 Greek mythology in western art and literature
 Greek underworld
 Upper World
 Religious practices
 Amphidromia
 Ceremonies of ancient Greece
 Greek divination
 Animal sacrifice
 Buphonia
 Holocaust (sacrifice)
 Hecatomb
 Ancient Greek funeral and burial practices
Ancient Greek funerary vases
Funeral oration
 Greek hero cult
 Hieros gamos in ancient Greece
 Festivals
 Athenian festivals
Anthesteria
Kronia
Lenaia
 Daphnephoria
 Dionysia
 Dionysian Mysteries
 Eleusinian Mysteries
 Pamboeotia
 Panathenaic Games
 Panhellenic Games
Ancient Olympic Games
 Thesmophoria
 Ancient Greek religious titles (priests)
 Archon basileus
 Asclepiad (title)
 Hierophylakes
 Iatromantis
 Hellenistic religion
 Decline of Greco-Roman polytheism

Sport in ancient Greece 

 Ancient Greek Olympic festivals
 Panhellenic Games
 Olympic Games of ancient Greece
 Ancient Olympic pentathlon
 Pankration
 Isthmian Games
 Nemean Games
 Pythian Games

Sports
 Boxing
 Episkyros
 Kottabos
 Running
 Wrestling

Equipment
 Halteres

Stadiums
 Kourion

Training facilities
 Gymnasium
 Palaestra

Economy of ancient Greece 

Economy of ancient Greece
 Agriculture in ancient Greece
 Pottery of ancient Greece

Health in ancient Greece 

 Medicine in ancient Greece
Food and diet in ancient medicine
 Mental illness in ancient Greece

Science of ancient Greece 

 Ancient Greek science
 Greek astronomy
Antikythera mechanism
 Greek mathematics
List of Greek mathematicians
Chronology of ancient Greek mathematicians
Timeline of Ancient Greek mathematicians

Technology of ancient Greece 

Ancient Greek technology
 Units of measurement in ancient Greece

See also 

 Outline of classical studies
 Outline of ancient Rome
 Outline of ancient Egypt
 Index of ancient Greece-related articles

References

External links

The Canadian Museum of Civilization—Greece Secrets of the Past
Ancient Greece website from the British Museum
Economic history of ancient Greece
The Greek currency history
Limenoscope, an ancient Greek ports database
The Ancient Theatre Archive, Greek and Roman theatre architecture
Illustrated Greek History—Dr. Janice Siegel, Department of Classics, Hampden-Sydney College, Virginia

 
Outlines of geography and places
Wikipedia outlines